The 1923 AAA Championship Car season consisted of 8 races, beginning in Beverly Hills, California on February 25, 1923 and concluding in the same location on November 29, 1923. The AAA National Champion was Eddie Hearne and the Indianapolis 500 winners were Tommy Milton and Howdy Wilcox.

Schedule and results
All races running on Dirt/Brick/Board Oval.

 Shared drive

Leading National Championship standings

See also
 1923 Indianapolis 500

References
 
 
 

AAA Championship Car season
AAA Championship Car
1923 in American motorsport